Kinard House is a historic home located at Ninety Six, Greenwood County, South Carolina. It was built about 1885, and is a two-story, five bay, gable-front-and-wing Folk Victorian dwelling. It is clad in weatherboard and sits on a stone pier foundation. The house was extensively altered about 1920.

It was the home of Henry Jefferson Kinard and his son Drayton Tucker Kinard II, prominent businessmen and public servants who represented Ninety Six and Greenwood County in the South Carolina House of Representatives in the late 19th and early-20th centuries.

It was listed on the National Register of Historic Places in 2007.

References

Houses on the National Register of Historic Places in South Carolina
Victorian architecture in South Carolina
Houses completed in 1885
National Register of Historic Places in Greenwood County, South Carolina
Houses in Greenwood County, South Carolina